Yeon Gi-sung (born 1 August 1989) is a South Korean footballer who plays as a forward.

Club career

On account of limited game time at Gyeongnam, the attacker went to Thailand to play for Thai Premier League team TTM Phichit in 2011, authoring a hat-trick right away and recording seven goals in total. However, he suffered a dislocated foot, requiring two surgeries, and was benched for 20 months before a four-month stint with BEC Tero Sasana in 2014, leading to a loan spell with PTT Rayong which was cut short by a torn ligament.

As one of the many repercussions of an injury, Yeon had to recover for about a year, finally transferring to Myanmar National League side Yadanarbon F.C. in 2015, helping the club to a runners-up medal. Going back to Thailand to play for Bangkok Christian College for the remainder of the season where he scored 7 times, the Korean officially became the property of Cambodian outfit Phnom Penh Crown FC in May 2017. Appearing in a number of games, Yeon placated the fans with 7 goals in an 11-0 crushing of CMAC FC. Comfortable with life in Cambodia's capital, the forward shares residency with four Korean footballers and two agents, going to Phnom Penh SunLin Church as a Christian.

References

External links

Expatriate footballers in Cambodia
Phnom Penh Crown FC players
People from Suwon
South Korean footballers
Association football forwards
Expatriate footballers in Thailand
Yeon Gi-sung
Yeon Gi-sung
South Korean expatriate footballers
Expatriate footballers in Myanmar
Myanmar National League players
Yadanarbon F.C. players
1989 births
Living people
Malaysia Super League players
Expatriate footballers in Malaysia
Sportspeople from Gyeonggi Province